Ladislav Fouček (10 December 1930 – 4 July 1974) was an Czechoslovak cyclist. He won silver medals in Men's 1,000 metres Time Trial and Men's Tandem Sprint, 2000 metres at the 1956 Summer Olympics.

References

External links
 
 
 

Czechoslovak male cyclists
1930 births
1974 deaths
Olympic silver medalists for Czechoslovakia
Cyclists at the 1952 Summer Olympics
Cyclists at the 1956 Summer Olympics
Olympic cyclists of Czechoslovakia
Olympic medalists in cycling
Sportspeople from Prague
Medalists at the 1956 Summer Olympics